Lonchurus elegans, the blackfin croaker, is a species of fish in the family Sciaenidae found in the Western Atlantic, from Colombia to Brazil.

This species reaches a length of

See also 
 List of data deficient fishes

References 

 Chao, L.N., 1978. Sciaenidae. In W. Fischer (ed.) FAO species identification sheets for fishery purposes. West Atlantic (Fishing Area 31). Volume 4. FAO, Rome.

External links 

 Lonchurus elegans at FishBase

Sciaenidae
Taxa named by Marinus Boeseman
Fish described in 1948